Jack Marks (February 11, 1927 – February 27, 2007) was a Canadian police officer.

Marks was born in Toronto and became a Toronto police officer in 1951 after military service (Royal Canadian Artillery) and a career as an electrician.  Marks was working a night shift on December 31, 1956, when police forces across the city united to become one. He rose through the ranks and was Deputy Chief of Field Operations before becoming Chief of Police. He served as chief of the Metro Toronto Police from 1984 to 1989 succeeding Jack Ackroyd. Marks was at police headquarters again on January 1, 2007, despite his illness, for the force's 50th anniversary.

Marks helped mould the force's commitment to building community and fostering diversity.

He died from peritoneal mesothelioma, a disease caused by exposure to asbestos, at the age of 80 in 2007.

External links
Toronto Police - Biography of Jack Marks
The Toronto Star, Mar 04, 2007 04:30 AM : 'He made Toronto a safer city' - Tributes pour in at sombre farewell for former police chief Jack Marks
The Toronto Star, Feb 28, 2007 04:30 AM, Jack Marks, 80: Ex-chief  - Old-school cop credited with modernizing force
City News, Wednesday, February 28, 2007: Colleagues Pay Tribute To Fallen Former Police Chief Jack Marks
City News, Saturday March 3, 2007: Hundreds Attend Funeral For Former Toronto Police Chief Jack Marks

1927 births
2007 deaths
Deaths from mesothelioma
Toronto police chiefs
Deaths from cancer in Ontario